The Journal of Halacha and Contemporary Society is a semiannual Orthodox Jewish academic journal published by the Rabbi Jacob Joseph School and edited by Alfred Cohen. As its title implies, it is devoted to the interface between halakha (halacha, Jewish law and ethics) and modern society; thus, some articles will discuss how recent scientific developments are viewed by halakha while others may examine modern trends in Jewish life.

Regular contributors include Dr. Fred Rosner on medical issues, Rabbi J. David Bleich, and the editor Rabbi Alfred Cohen.  According to the masthead, all articles are vetted by halachic authorities.

The journal also often includes reviews of books on subjects that are relevant to the journal's scope.

See also
List of theological journals

External links 
 Description at Jlaw.com
 Selected articles

Halacha and Contemporary Society
Modern Orthodox Judaism
Jewish literature